Drake Street tram stop was a proposed tram stop for Greater Manchester's Metrolink light rail system, that was to be created to serve passengers boarding and alighting at Drake Street in Rochdale, England. It was also known by the name Wet Rake tram stop, and was set to be located on the Oldham and Rochdale Line between Rochdale railway station and Rochdale Town Centre tram stop.

Drake Street was set to be constructed during Phase 3b of Metrolink's expansion, but in March 2011 it was scrapped by the Greater Manchester Passenger Transport Executive which believed it would be too close to Rochdale Town Centre and could serve as an efficiency saving to allow the construction of Kingsway Business Park tram stop.

References

External links
 https://web.archive.org/web/20120211143030/http://www.lrta.org/Manchester/Oldham_Rochdale.html
 Metrolink Stop at Drake Street set to be scrapped - Rochdale Observer
 Drake Street Metrolink stop comes to the end - Rochdale Observer
 http://menmedia.co.uk/rochdaleobserver/news/s/1454391_fresh-hope-for-axed-drake-street-metrolink-tram-stop

Proposed Manchester Metrolink tram stops
Tram stops on the East Didsbury to Rochdale line